Murielle Ahouré (born 23 August 1987) is an Ivorian sprinter who competes in the 60 meters, 100 m and 200 m.  She was a double silver medalist at the 2013 world championships in Moscow. She came second in both the 100 and 200 meters at this event. Ahouré was the gold medallist in the 60 m at the 2018 IAAF World Indoor Championships.

She also won a silver medal at 60 metres event at 2012 IAAF World Indoor Championships in Istanbul, Turkey. She was the 2009 NCAA Indoor Champion at 200 metres while running for the University of Miami. Ahouré's personal best at 100 m is 10.78 (Montverde, USA, 2016) and in 200 m 22.24 (Monaco, 2013).

She holds African records in  60m and 200 metres indoor. At the 2012 Summer Olympics she placed sixth in the 200 m and seventh in the 100 m.

She ran under seven seconds for the 60 metres for the first time in February 2013, becoming the eighth fastest woman ever with her time of 6.99 seconds. In 2018 she won the gold medal in the 60 m at the 2018 IAAF World Indoor Championships, and broke the African record with a time of 6.97 seconds (sixth fastest woman ever).

Early life and career
The daughter of General Mathias Doué, Chief of Staff of the Armed Forces of the Ivory Coast, Ahouré travelled a lot in her early life, living in France, China, Japan and Germany, before moving to the United States at the age of 14. She took up athletics in her second year at high school, mostly as a way to make friends. After high school, she studied criminal law at George Mason University. In her final year at university, she transferred to the University of Miami to work with Amy Deem. She took the 2009 NCAA indoor 200 m title, with a then world's best time. That year. she also twice broke the Ivory Coast 100 m record outdoors.

In 2010, she moved to Houston after an injury-marred start to the season. She went to train under Allen Powell. In 2011, she again broke the Ivorian record.

International career
In 2012, she made her international debut for the Ivory Coast at the World Indoor Championships, winning a silver medal in the 60 m, with a new personal best.  This was the first World Indoor Athletics for the Ivory Coast. Despite breaking the Ivorian 100 m record again, she was unable to win a medal at the 2012 Summer Olympics.

In the 2013 indoor athletics season, she broke the African 60 m indoor record with a time of 7.00 seconds. She was undefeated for the entire indoor season.  At the 2013 World Athletics Championships, the 200 m was expected to be her stronger event, but she also managed to edge out defending champion Carmelita Jeter to win silver behind Shelly-Ann Fraser-Pryce in the 100 m.  In doing so, she became the first Ivorian to win a World Athletics Championships medal and the first African woman to win a medal in the 100 or 200 m at the World Championships. For her successes, she was awarded the rank of Chevalier of the National Order of Merit by President Alassane Ouattara. She was also named the Ivory Coast's best sportsperson of the year.

At the 2014 African Championships, she lost the 100 m to Blessing Okagbare, but won the 200 m which Okagbare did not participate in.

In 2015, Ahouré won her first Diamond League 100 m at the Oslo meeting.  At the World Championships that year, she did not make the 100 m final after finishing 4th in her semi-final, and in doing so aggravated a knee injury which prevented her from running the 200 m.

The knee injury prevented her from training for eight months, causing her to miss the 2016 indoor season.  She also moved training group, to Dennis Mitchell's group in Florida. In March 2016 Ahouré launched her foundation which aims to help bring back sport in school, assist children's education and empower underprivileged women and children.  In June, she claimed the African 100 m record from Blessing Okagbare.

Achievements

Personal bests

All information taken from IAAF profile.

References

External links

Videos
 Women's 60m | World Indoor Championships Birmingham 2018 on YouTube via World Athletics

1987 births
Living people
Ivorian female sprinters
Miami Hurricanes women's track and field athletes
Athletes (track and field) at the 2012 Summer Olympics
Athletes (track and field) at the 2016 Summer Olympics
Olympic athletes of Ivory Coast
World Athletics Championships athletes for Ivory Coast
World Athletics Championships medalists
Sportspeople from Abidjan
George Mason Patriots women's track and field athletes
World Athletics Indoor Championships winners
World Athletics Indoor Championships medalists
Diamond League winners
Athletes (track and field) at the 2020 Summer Olympics
Olympic female sprinters